Bolshekyzylbayevo (Olo Qıźılbay) is a rural locality (a village) in Alegazovsky Selsoviet, Mechetlinsky District, Bashkortostan, Russia. The population was 451 as of 2010. There are 9 streets.

Geography 
Bolshekyzylbayevo is located 17 km west Bolsheustyikinskoye (the district's administrative centre) by road. Sosnovka is the nearest rural locality.

References 

Rural localities in Mechetlinsky District